Kyle David Smith (born 16 September 1991) is a British motorcycle racer. He competed in the British Supersport Championship aboard a Triumph 765 cc until a crash caused a broken pelvis in September 2021.

Career

He has competed in the Spanish 125GP Championship, the Spanish Kawasaki Ninja Cup—where he was champion in 2009—and the Spanish Stock Extreme series, where he finished runner-up in 2012. After losing his ride in the Moto2 World Championship during the 2013 season he competed in the European Superstock 600 Championship for Agro-On Racedays aboard a Honda CBR600RR and the Spanish CEV Moto2 Championship for TSR Motorsports aboard a Kalex for the rest of the year. After spending a full season in the FIM Superstock 1000 Cup in 2014, in 2015 he competed in the Supersport World Championship for PATA Honda aboard a Honda CBR600RR—achieving his first win in the series in Losail—and he was second in the Suzuka 8 Hours endurance race with Dominique Aegerter and Joshua Hook. For 2016 he moved to the CIA Landlord Insurance Honda team.

Career statistics

Grand Prix motorcycle racing

By season

By class

Races by year
(key) (Races in bold indicate pole position; races in italics indicate fastest lap)

Supersport World Championship

Races by year
(key) (Races in bold indicate pole position; races in italics indicate fastest lap)

Superbike World Championship

Races by year

(key) (Races in bold indicate pole position) (Races in italics indicate fastest lap)

* Season still in progress.

References

External links 
 
 

Living people
1991 births
Sportspeople from Huddersfield
English expatriate sportspeople in Spain
English motorcycle racers
Moto2 World Championship riders
Supersport World Championship riders
FIM Superstock 1000 Cup riders